The Arab Agricultural Revolution was the transformation in agriculture from the 8th to the 13th century in the Islamic region of the Old World. The agronomic literature of the time, with major books by Ibn Bassal and Abū l-Khayr al-Ishbīlī, demonstrates the extensive diffusion of useful plants to Medieval Spain (al-Andalus), and the growth in Islamic scientific knowledge of agriculture and horticulture. Medieval Arab historians and geographers described al-Andalus as a fertile and prosperous region with abundant water, full of fruit from trees such as the olive and pomegranate. Archaeological evidence demonstrates improvements in animal husbandry and in irrigation such as with the sakia water wheel. These changes made agriculture far more productive, supporting population growth, urbanisation, and increased stratification of society.

The revolution was first described by the historian Antonio Garcia Maceira in 1876. The name was coined by the historian Andrew Watson in an influential but at the time controversial 1974 paper. However, 40 years on, it has proven useful to historians and has been supported by findings in archaeology and archaeobotany.

Medieval history

Islamic agronomy

The first Arabic book on agronomy to reach al-Andalus, in the 10th century, was Ibn Wahshiyya's al-Filahat al-nabatiyya (Nabatean Agriculture), from Iraq; it was followed by texts written in al-Andalus, such as the Mukhtasar kitab al-filaha (Abridged Book of Agriculture) by Al-Zahrawi (Abulcasis) from Cordoba, around 1000 AD.

The eleventh century agronomist Ibn Bassal of Toledo described 177 species in his Dīwān al-filāha (The Court of Agriculture). Ibn Bassal had travelled widely across the Islamic world, returning with a detailed knowledge of agronomy. His practical and systematic book both gives detailed descriptions of useful plants including leaf and root vegetables, herbs, spices and trees, and explains how to propagate and care for them.

The twelfth century agronomist Abū l-Khayr al-Ishbīlī of Seville described in detail in his Kitāb al-Filāha (Treatise on Agriculture) how olive trees should be grown, grafted (with an account of his own experiments), treated for disease, and harvested, and gave similar detail for crops such as cotton.

Medieval Islamic agronomists including Ibn Bassal and Abū l-Khayr described agricultural and horticultural techniques including how to propagate the olive and the date palm, crop rotation of flax with wheat or barley, and companion planting of grape and olive. These books demonstrate the importance of agriculture both as a traditional practice and as a scholarly science. In al-Andalus, there is evidence that the almanacs and manuals of agronomy helped to catalyse change, causing scholars to seek out new kinds of vegetable and fruit, and to carry out experiments in botany; in turn, these helped to improve actual practice in the region's agriculture. During the 11th century Abbadid dynasty in Seville, the sultan took a personal interest in fruit production, discovering from a peasant the method he had used to grow some exceptionally large melons—pinching off all but ten of the buds, and using wooden props to hold the stems off the ground.

Islamic animal husbandry

Archaeological evidence from the measurement of bones (osteometry) demonstrates that sheep in southern Portugal increased in size during the Islamic period, while cattle increased when the area became Christian after its reconquest. The archaeologist Simon Davis assumes that the change in size signifies improvement by animal husbandry, while in his view the choice of sheep is readily explained by the Islamic liking for mutton.

Islamic irrigation

During the period, irrigated cultivation developed due to the growing use of animal power, water power and wind power. Windpumps were used to pump water since at least the 9th century in what is now Afghanistan, Iran and Pakistan.

The Islamic period in the Fayyum depression of Middle Egypt, like medieval Islamic Spain (al-Andalus), was characterised by extremely large-scale systems of irrigation, with both the supply, via gravity-fed canals, and the management of water under local tribal control. In the Islamic period in al-Andalus, whose rural parts were equally tribal, the irrigation canal network was much enlarged. Similarly, in the Fayyum, new villages were established in the period, and new water-dependent orchards and sugar plantations were developed.

The sakia or animal-powered irrigation wheel was likely introduced to Islamic Spain in early Umayyad times (in the 8th century). Improvements to it were described by Hispano-Arabic agronomists in the 11th and 12th centuries. From there, sakia irrigation was spread further around Spain and Morocco. A 13th century observer claimed there were "5000" waterwheels along the Guadalquivir in Islamic Spain; even allowing for medieval exaggeration, irrigation systems were certainly extensive in the region at that time. The supply of water was sufficient for cities as well as agriculture: the Roman aqueduct network into the city of Cordoba was repaired in the Umayyad period, and extended.

Early accounts of Islamic Spain

Medieval Andalusian historians such as Ibn Bassam, Ibn Hayyan, and Ibn Hazm, and geographers such as al-Bakri, al-Idrisi, and al-Zuhri, described Islamic Spain as a fortunate entity. Indeed, the tenth-century Jewish scribe Menahem Ben Saruq wrote to the Khazar king "The name of our land in which we dwell ... in the language of the Arabs, the inhabitants of the land, al-Andalus ... the land is rich, abounding in rivers, springs, and aqueducts; a land of corn, oil, and wine, of fruits and all manner of delicacies; it has pleasure-gardens and orchards, fruitful trees of every kind, including ... [the white mulberry] upon which the silkworm feeds". al-Maqqari, quoting the ninth-century Ahmad ibn Muhammad ibn Musa al-Razi, describes al-Andalus as a rich land "with good, arable soil, fertile settlements, flowing copiously with plentiful rivers and fresh springs." Al-Andalus was associated with cultivated trees like olive and pomegranate. After the Christian reconquest, arable farming was frequently abandoned, the land reverting to pasture, though some farmers tried to adopt Islamic agronomy. Western historians have wondered if the Medieval Arab historians were reliable, given that they had a motive to emphasize the splendour of al-Andalus, but evidence from archaeology has broadly supported their claims.

Scholarly debate

In 1876, the historian Antonia Garcia Maceira argued that where the Romans and then the Goths who farmed in Spain made little effort to improve their crops or to import species from other regions, under "the Arabs", there was an agricultural "revolution" in al-Andalus caused "by implementing the knowledge that they acquired through observation during their peregrinations, and the result was extensive agricultural settlement."

In 1974, the historian Andrew Watson published a paper proposing an extension of Garcia Maceira's hypothesis of agricultural revolution in Al-Andalus. Watson argued that the economy established by Arab and other Muslim traders across the Old World enabled the diffusion of many crops and farming techniques throughout the Islamic world, as well as the adaptation of crops and techniques from and to regions outside it. Crops from Africa, such as sorghum, from China, such as citrus fruits, and from India, such as mango, rice, cotton and sugar cane, were distributed throughout Islamic lands, which he believed had not previously grown these plants. He listed eighteen such crops. Watson suggested that these introductions, along with an increased mechanization of agriculture and irrigation, led to major changes in economy, population distribution, vegetation cover, agricultural production and income, population, urban growth, distribution of the labour force, industries linked to agriculture, cooking, diet and clothing in the Islamic world.

In 1997, the historian of science Howard R. Turner wrote that Islamic study of soil, climate, seasons and ecology "promoted a remarkably advanced horticulture and agriculture. The resulting knowledge, transmitted to Europe after the eleventh century, helped to improve farming techniques, widen the variety of crops, and increase yields on the continent's farmlands. In addition, an enormous variety of crops was introduced to the West from or through Muslim lands".

In 2006, James E. McClellan III and Harold Dorn stated in their book Science and Technology in World History that Islam had depended as much on its farmers as its soldiers, and that the farmers had helped to create a "scientific civilisation": "in what amounted to an agricultural revolution they adapted new and more diversified food crops to the Mediterranean ecosystem: rice, sugar cane, cotton, melons, citrus fruits, and other products. With rebuilt and enlarged systems of irrigation, Islamic farming extended the growing season and increased productivity." They stated further that the importance of these efforts was indicated by the "uninterrupted series" of books on agriculture and irrigation; another indication was provided by the many books on particular animals of importance to Islamic farming and government, including horses and bees. They ascribed the population growth, urbanisation, social stratification, centralisation of politics and state-controlled scholarship to the improvement in agricultural productivity.

By 2008, the archaeozoologist Simon Davis could write without qualification that in the Iberian peninsula "Agriculture flourished: the Moslems introduced new irrigation techniques and new plants like sugar cane, rice, cotton, spinach, pomegranates and citrus trees, to name just a few... Seville had become a Mecca for agronomists, and its hinterland, or Aljarafe, their laboratory."

In 2011, the Arabist  wrote that in Medieval Egypt, the Arab Agricultural Revolution was followed by a "commercial revolution" as the Fatimids (in power 909-1171) made Egypt a major trade centre for the Mediterranean and the Indian Ocean, and in the more cosmopolitan and sophisticated society that resulted, a "culinary revolution" which transformed Egyptian cuisine.

Early scepticism

Watson's work was met with some early scepticism, such as from the historian Jeremy Johns in 1984. Johns argued that Watson's selection of 18 plants was "peculiar", since the banana, coconut, mango and shaddock were unimportant in the Islamic region at the time, detracting from the discussion of the staple crops. Johns further noted that the evidence of diffusion of crops was imperfect, that Watson made "too many minor slips and larger errors" such as getting dates wrong or claiming that a 1439 document was Norman, and had failed to make best use of the evidence that was available, such as of the decline of classical agriculture, or even to mention the changing geomorphology. Johns however concluded that "The hypothesis of an 'Abbasid agricultural revolution is challenging and may well prove useful".

The historian Eliyahu Ashtor wrote in 1976 that agricultural production declined in the period immediately after the Arab conquest in areas of Mesopotamia and Egypt, on the limited basis of records of taxes collected on cultivated areas. In a 2012 paper focusing on the Sawād area of Iraq, Michele Campopiano concluded that Iraqi agricultural output declined in the 7th to 10th century; he attributed this decline to "competition of the different ruling groups to gain access to land surplus".

Diffusion not revolution

In 2009, the historian Michael Decker stated that widespread cultivation and consumption of four staples, namely durum wheat, Asiatic rice, sorghum and cotton were already commonplace under the Roman Empire and Sassanid Empire, centuries before the Islamic period. He suggested that their actual role in Islamic agriculture had been exaggerated, arguing that the agricultural practices of Muslim cultivators did not fundamentally differ from those of pre-Islamic times, but evolved from the hydraulic know-how and 'basket' of agricultural plants inherited from their Roman and Persian predecessors. In the case of cotton, which the Romans grew mainly in Egypt, the plant remained a minor crop in the classical Islamic period: the major fibre was flax, as in Roman times. Decker further asserted that the advanced state of ancient irrigation practices "rebuts sizeable parts of the Watson thesis," since for example in Spain, archaeological work indicated that the Islamic irrigation system was developed from the existing Roman network, rather than replacing it. Decker agreed that "Muslims made an important contribution to world farming through the westward diffusion of some crops", but that the introduction of "agronomic techniques and materials" had been less widespread and less consistent than Watson had suggested. Furthermore, there is clear evidence that agricultural devices such as watermills and waterwheels, shadufs, norias, sakias, water screws and water pumps were widely known and applied in Greco-Roman agriculture long before the Muslim conquests.

Revolution driven by social institutions

D. Fairchild Ruggles rejected the view that the medieval Arab historians had been wrong to claim that agriculture had been revolutionised, and that it had instead simply been restored to a state like that before the collapse of the Roman Empire. She argued that while the medieval Arab historians may not have had a reliable picture of agricultural knowledge before their time, they were telling the truth about a dramatic change to the landscape of Islamic Spain. A whole new "system of crop rotation, fertilization, transplanting, grafting, and irrigation" was swiftly and systematically put into place under a new legal framework of land ownership and tenancy. In her view, therefore, there was indeed an agricultural revolution in al-Andalus, but it consisted principally of new social institutions rather than of new agronomic techniques. Ruggles stated that this "dramatic economic, scientific, and social transformation" began in al-Andalus and had spread throughout the Islamic Mediterranean by the 10th century.

Historiography

Looking back over 40 years of scholarship since Watson's theory, the historian of land use Paolo Squatriti wrote in 2014 that the thesis had been widely used and cited by historians and archaeologists working in different fields. It had "proved to be applicable in scholarly debates about technological diffusion in pre-industrial societies, the 'decline' of Islamic civilization, the relations between elite and peasant cultural systems, Europe's historical Sonderweg in the second millennium CE, the origins of globalization, [and] the nature of Mediterraneity." Squatriti noted that Watson had originally trained in economics, and applied this interest to his historical studies. Squatriti described Watson's paper as concise and elegant, and popular for its usefulness in supporting the theses of many different historians. He observed that Watson's thesis did not depend on claims of new introductions of plants into any region, but of their "diffusion and normalization", i.e. of their becoming widely and generally used, even if they were known from Roman times. Calling Watson's "philological" approach "old fashioned", and given that Watson had worked "virtually without archaeology", Squatrini expressed surprise that recent research in archaeobotany had failed to "decisively undermine" Watson's thesis.

Notes

References

Sources

External links
 
 Crop Diffusion in the Early Islamic World

History of agriculture
Islamic Golden Age
Technology in the medieval Islamic world
Agricultural revolutions
Technology in the Middle Ages